Bia is an Argentine telenovela produced by Pegsa y Non Stop for Disney Channel Latin America in collaboration with Disney Channel Europe, Middle East & Africa. The series premiered on June 24, 2019. The first season ended on November 8, 2019, with a total of 60 episodes.

In October 2019, the series was renewed for a second season which aired from March 16, 2020 and ended on July 24, 2020, once again consisting of 60 episodes.

During the course of the series, 120 episodes of Bia have aired over two seasons.

Series overview

Episodes

Season 1 (2019)

Season 2 (2020)

Notes

References 

Bia